Ialtris haetianus, the Hispaniolan upland racer or Haitian ground snake, is a species of snake in the family Colubridae.  The species is native to Haiti and the Dominican Republic.

References

Ialtris
Reptiles of Haiti
Reptiles of the Dominican Republic
Reptiles described in 1935